M. Joseph Michael Perera (born 15 September 1941) is a Sri Lankan politician, a former member of the Parliament of Sri Lanka and its 17th speaker.

References
 

Speakers of the Parliament of Sri Lanka
Living people
Members of the 7th Parliament of Ceylon
Members of the 8th Parliament of Sri Lanka
Members of the 9th Parliament of Sri Lanka
Members of the 10th Parliament of Sri Lanka
Members of the 11th Parliament of Sri Lanka
Members of the 12th Parliament of Sri Lanka
Members of the 13th Parliament of Sri Lanka
Members of the 14th Parliament of Sri Lanka
Sri Lankan Roman Catholics
United National Party politicians
1941 births
Home affairs ministers of Sri Lanka
Deputy ministers of Sri Lanka
Fisheries ministers of Sri Lanka